The Roman Catholic Territorial Prelature of Jesús María (del Nayar) (erected 13 January 1962) is a suffragan of the Archdiocese of Guadalajara in Mexico. The episcopal see is in Jesús María, Nayarit.

Bishops
Manuel Arvizu, O.F.M. (1962-1992)
José Antonio Pérez Sánchez, O.F.M. (1992-2010)
José de Jesús González Hernández, O.F.M. (2010-

Coadjutor bishop
José Antonio Pérez Sánchez, O.F.M. (1990-1992)

External links and references

Jesus Maria del Nayar
Jesus Maria del Nayar
Jesús María del Nayar, Roman Catholic Territorial Prelature of
Jesus Maria del Nayar
Jesus Maria del Nayar